Vogel is an impact crater in the Argyre quadrangle of Mars, located at 36.8°S latitude and 13.4°W longitude, and is inside Noachis Terra. The name was approved by IAU's Working Group for Planetary System Nomenclature in 1973.

Vogel is located northeast of Hartwig crater.

See also 
 List of craters on Mars

References 

Argyre quadrangle
Impact craters on Mars